Jerry Michael Straka is an American atmospheric scientist with expertise microphysics of clouds, cloud modeling, and dynamics of severe convection in conjunction with weather radar. He was in leadership roles in both the VORTEX projects and subsequent field research focusing on tornadogenesis.

Straka earned a B.S. and M.S. in 1984 and 1986, respectively, from the University of Wisconsin–Milwaukee. His masters dissertation was: A Mesoscale Numerical Study of Environmental Conditions Preceding the 08 June 1984 Tornado Outbreak over South Central Wisconsin. Straka earned a Ph.D. in meteorology from the University of Wisconsin–Madison in 1989 with the doctoral dissertation: Hail Growth in a Highly Glaciated Central High Plains Multi-cellular Hailstorm. He is a professor at the University of Oklahoma in Norman.

See also 
 Robert Davies-Jones
 Katharine Kanak
 Paul Markowski
 Erik N. Rasmussen

References 

 Jerry M. Straka

External links 
 OU faculty page
 

University of Wisconsin–Milwaukee alumni
University of Wisconsin–Madison alumni
University of Oklahoma faculty
American meteorologists
Storm chasers
Living people
Year of birth missing (living people)